Elisabeth Altmann-Gottheiner (March 26, 1874 – October 21, 1930) was one of the first women to become a university lecturer in Germany and a women's rights activist.

She was born in Berlin. In 1904, she received a doctorate in Zurich, Switzerland. By 1908, she was a lecturer at the economic College in Mannheim, and by 1924 had a professorship in economics. She died in Mannheim, aged 56.

Academics 
She wrote a number of books and articles on economic questions. From 1912 on she edited the feminist yearbook Jahrbuch der Frauenbewegung.

The University of Mannheim grants the annual award "Elisabeth Altmann-Gottheiner-Preis" for students' theses on gender research.

References

Further reading 
 Salomon, Alice: "Elisabeth Altmann-Gottheiner zum Gedächtnis" (3. Jg., Nr. 9, 1. Dezember 1930) Die Österreicherin: Zeitschrift für alle Interessen der Frau, hrsg. vom Bund österreichischer Frauenvereine, Wien, 1928 - 1938 (Heft 2)
 Zahn-Harnack, Agnes: "Altmann-Gottheiner, Elisabeth." In: Neue Deutsche Biographie (NDB). Band 1, Duncker & Humblot, Berlin 1953, S. 227

1874 births
1930 deaths
German economists
German women economists
Academic staff of the University of Mannheim
Feminist studies scholars
German women's rights activists